Stemonitis axifera is a species of slime mold. It fruits in clusters on dead wood, and has distinctive tall reddish-brown sporangia, supported on slender stalks.

Taxonomy
The species was first described as Trichia axifera by Jean Baptiste François Pierre Bulliard in 1791. Thomas Huston MacBride transferred it to the genus Stemonitis in 1889. Stemonitis fasciculata and Stemonitis smithii are synonyms.

Description
The bright rusty brown color of mature sporangia lightens to a pale brown after the spores have been dispersed. Spores measure 5 by 7 μm and have a smooth to minutely punctate surface texture.

Development
Stemonitis axifera requires about 20 hours to finish making its fruit bodies. Of this, eight hours are needed for induction of the sporangia and the development of the stalk and the columella, six hours more for the sporocarps to produce pigment and mature, and an additional six until the spores are discharged.

Ecology
The slime mold grows on decaying wood. When the fruit bodies consist of milky white sporangia, they are a favoured food source for Philomycus slugs (mantleslugs), such as P. carolinianus and P. flexuolaris. The slugs emerge at night from under flaps of bark and migrate to more exposed areas at the top of wet logs, bypassing more mature, pigmented fruit bodies for the younger white ones. The slugs eat the sporangia stalks from the top down. The feeding preference of Philomycus slugs for immature white sporangia is not seen in other slug species.

References

External links
 

Myxogastria
Species described in 1791
Taxa named by Jean Baptiste François Pierre Bulliard